Joseph Frank Schmiesing (born April 1, 1945) is a former professional American football defensive lineman in the National Football League. He played seven seasons for the St. Louis Cardinals, the Detroit Lions, the Baltimore Colts, and the New York Jets.

1945 births
Living people
People from Melrose, Minnesota
Players of American football from Minnesota
American football defensive ends
American football defensive tackles
Minnesota Golden Gophers football players
St. Louis Cardinals (football) players
Detroit Lions players
Baltimore Colts players
New York Jets players
New Mexico State Aggies football players